Eastham station was a train station in Eastham, Massachusetts. It was built by the Old Colony Railroad around 1870 when the rail line was extended from Orleans to Wellfleet. Passenger service to this station ended in 1941 when the New Haven Railroad discontinued scheduled service between Yarmouth and Provincetown.

References

External links

Eastham, Massachusetts
Old Colony Railroad Stations on Cape Cod
Stations along Old Colony Railroad lines
Railway stations in the United States opened in 1870
Railway stations closed in 1941
Former railway stations in Massachusetts